James Alfred Standen (born 30 May 1935) is an English former professional footballer who played as a goalkeeper in the Football League for Arsenal, Luton Town, West Ham United, Millwall and Portsmouth. He won the FA Cup and the European Cup Winners' Cup with West Ham. Standen was also a professional cricketer for Worcestershire, where he won a County Championship.

Football career
Jim Standen started his footballing career at Rickmansworth, being discovered there by Leslie Compton who introduced him to Arsenal, where he joined the club in 1953. His appearances at Arsenal were limited, first by National Service and then by the presence of Wales international Jack Kelsey. He finally made his debut for Arsenal against Burnley on 7 December 1957. He then deputised for Kelsey when he was injured in the 1958–59 season and upon Kelsey's return the two goalkeepers shared the spot during the 1959–60 season. However, Kelsey regained the number one jersey outright at the start of 1960–61 and Standen left Arsenal for Luton Town in October 1960. He made 38 appearances for Arsenal in all.

At Luton, Standen was forced to understudy again, this time for England's Ron Baynham. Standen then joined east London club West Ham United as an emergency signing after their regular keeper Lawrie Leslie suffered a broken leg in 1962. He became a big hit at Upton Park and went on to win the 1963–64 FA Cup and the 1964–65 European Cup Winners' Cup with the club. Altogether Standen made 179 league and 57 cup appearances for West Ham.

After losing his place due to the arrival of Bobby Ferguson in 1967, Standen moved to the Detroit Cougars in the United States. He returned to England with Millwall for the 1969–70 season, playing eight games for the south London club before signing a two-year contract with Portsmouth. After 13 games for Pompey, he retired from football.

After his retirement, he owned a sports shop in Camberley, Surrey, before moving to California, where he was a goalkeeper coach at Fresno State University for a time.

Cricket career
As a cricketer, Standen was primarily a right-arm medium pace bowler. After previously playing for Chorleywood and in the Minor Counties Championship for Hertfordshire, he joined Worcestershire in 1959 and played first-class cricket. He won the County Championship with them in 1964, playing in 11 of the 28 games and heading the First Class bowling averages with 52 wickets at 14.42. The following season the county won the title again, but he played in only one match. In all he took 313 first-class wickets between 1959 and 1970 at an average of 25.34.

Honours

Football
West Ham United
FA Cup: 1963–64
FA Charity Shield: 1964
European Cup Winners' Cup: 1964–65

Cricket
Worcestershire
County Championship: 1964

References

External links
Jim Standen at westhamstats.info

Nostalgia Series; Jim Standen at West Ham Till I Die

1935 births
Living people
Footballers from Edmonton, London
English footballers
Association football goalkeepers
Arsenal F.C. players
Luton Town F.C. players
West Ham United F.C. players
Millwall F.C. players
Portsmouth F.C. players
English cricketers
Worcestershire cricketers
International Cavaliers cricketers
Hertfordshire cricketers
Minor Counties cricketers
English Football League players
Cricketers from Greater London
Detroit Cougars (soccer) players
North American Soccer League (1968–1984) players
Expatriate soccer players in the United States
California State University, Fresno people
English expatriate sportspeople in the United States
English expatriate footballers
FA Cup Final players